The 2010–11 Monterrey season was the 64th professional season of Mexico's top-flight football league. The season is split into two tournaments—the Torneo Apertura and the Torneo Clausura—each with identical formats and each contested by the same eighteen teams. Monterrey began their season on July 24, 2010 against San Luis, Monterrey will play their homes games on Saturdays at 5:00pm. Monterrey won their fourth title by defeating Santos Laguna 6–2 in aggregate score on December 5, 2010.

Torneo Apertura

Squad

Apertura 2010 results

Regular season

Final phase 

Monterrey advanced due to being the higher seed in the classification phase

Monterrey won 2–0 on aggregate

Monterrey won 5–3 on aggregate

Goalscorers

Transfers

In

Out

Regular season statistics

Results summary

Results by round

Torneo Clausura

Squad 
For recent transfers, see List of Mexican Football Transfers Summer 2010.

Clausura 2011 results

Regular season

Final phase 

UNAM advanced due to being the higher seed in the classification phase

CONCACAF Champions League

Group stage

Table

Results by round

Knockout stage

Goalscorers 
Clausura 2011 and Champions League Knockout Stage

Regular season statistics

Results summary

Results by round

References 

2010–11 Primera División de México season
Mexican football clubs 2010–11 season
2011